Wagner Ricardo Silva da Silva (born 27 May 1991), simply known as Wagner, is a Brazilian footballer who plays for Avenida as an attacking midfielder.

Club career
Born in Eldorado do Sul, Rio Grande do Sul, Wagner had failed trials at both Internacional and Grêmio. After making his debuts as a senior with Santo Ângelo in 2011, he went on to appear with Três Passos, Tupy, São José-PA and Cruzeiro, all in his native state, aside from playing for a number of amateur clubs.

With Cruzeiro, Wagner impressed during 2015 Campeonato Gaúcho. On 29 April of that year he signed a contract with Série A side Chapecoense.

Wagner made his debut in the main category of Brazilian football on 24 May 2015, coming on as a second-half substitute for Ananias in a 1–0 home win against Santos. He scored his first professional goal on 19 August 2015, netting the first in a 1–1 Copa Sudamericana away draw against Ponte Preta; it was also Chape's first goal in a continental competition.

References

External links

1991 births
Living people
Sportspeople from Rio Grande do Sul
Brazilian footballers
Association football midfielders
Campeonato Brasileiro Série A players
Campeonato Brasileiro Série B players
Campeonato Brasileiro Série D players
Associação Esportiva e Recreativa Santo Ângelo players
Esporte Clube São José players
Esporte Clube Cruzeiro players
Associação Chapecoense de Futebol players
Goiás Esporte Clube players
Santa Cruz Futebol Clube players
Grêmio Esportivo Brasil players
Cianorte Futebol Clube players
Sociedade Esportiva e Recreativa Caxias do Sul players
Esporte Clube Avenida players
Clube Esportivo Aimoré players